Babaheydar (also Romanized as Bābā Ḩeydar and Bāba Haīdar) is a city in Babaheydar District of Farsan County, Chaharmahal and Bakhtiari province, Iran. At the 2006 census, its population was 10,922 in 2,245 households, when it was a village in the Central District. The following census in 2011 counted 11,099 people in 2,897 households. The latest census in 2016 showed a population of 11,202 people in 3,276 households, by which time the village had been raised to the status of a city within the recently formed district of the same name. The city is populated by Lurs.

References 

Farsan County

Cities in Chaharmahal and Bakhtiari Province

Populated places in Chaharmahal and Bakhtiari Province

Populated places in Farsan County

Luri settlements in Chaharmahal and Bakhtiari Province